Robin Patrick Olsen (born 8 January 1990) is a Swedish professional footballer who plays as a goalkeeper for Premier League club Aston Villa and the Sweden national team.

Club career

Early life and career
Olsen's parents are Danish and he used to hold a Danish passport, but grew up in Sweden. He began his career playing for Malmö FF youth teams before moving to the academy of BK Olympic. At the age of 16 he joined IF Limhamn Bunkeflo and made his debut in the Swedish second tier of a year later.

Following a knee injury he went on to play for Bunkeflo FF and IFK Klagshamn.

Malmö FF

In 2011, Olsen re-joined Malmö FF. He made his Allsvenskan debut on 1 October 2012 in an away fixture against Syrianska FC, when first choice goalkeeper Johan Dahlin was suspended, and kept a clean sheet as the match ended 2–0 in Malmö's favour. In the match on 5 April 2013 against Åtvidabergs FF Dahlin had to be substituted at half time for an injury and Olsen once again took his place. Olsen then managed to hold a clean sheet in the remaining part of the match as well as a further three matches before conceding a goal in stoppage time in his fourth match of the season in the away fixture against IFK Göteborg. Olsen kept Dahlin out of the starting eleven for some further matches before he was given the place on the bench once again. In total Olsen played 10 matches for Malmö FF during the league title winning 2013 season, an unusual feat for a second choice goalkeeper.

Prior to the start of the 2014 season the club sold Johan Dahlin, making Olsen the first choice goalkeeper. In the 2014 season, Olsen made 29 out of 30 league appearances and was a vital piece of the team that defended the clubs league title and qualified for the group stage of the 2014–15 UEFA Champions League. For his performances in the league Olsen was awarded Allsvenskan goalkeeper of the year. He was also nominated for Swedish goalkeeper of the year at Fotbollsgalan.

PAOK
Olsen signed a four-year contract with Greek team PAOK F.C. on 1 July 2015, with a transfer fee of nearly €650,000 being paid to Malmö.

Copenhagen
On 26 January 2016, Olsen would join F.C. Copenhagen on loan for six months, to cover for the injured Stephan Andersen. F.C. Copenhagen wanted to make the loan move permanent, and on 24 May 2016 Olsen signed a four-year contract with the club for a transfer fee of almost €600,000.

Roma
In July 2018, Olsen signed a five-year contract with the Italian club A.S. Roma with a reported fee worth up to €12,000,000, replacing the outgoing Alisson Becker. He marked his debut for the team with a clean sheet in a 1–0 away victory against Torino F.C. on 19 August 2018. Olsen was eventually replaced by veteran Antonio Mirante by interim manager Claudio Ranieri towards the end of the season. In total, Olsen made 35 appearances in his sole season at Roma, conceding 58 goals and keeping just seven clean sheets.

Loan to Cagliari
In August 2019, Olsen joined Cagliari Calcio on a season-long loan. On 25 November 2019, Olsen was sent off in an away game against U.S. Lecce for pushing Gianluca Lapadula, who in turn had pushed Olsen for kicking the ball away. Both players were sent off, received a fine of €10,000, and Olsen was suspended for the next four Serie A matches.

Loan to Everton
Olsen joined Premier League club Everton on a season-long loan on 5 October 2020.

He played his first game for Everton on 1 November, away from home in the league against Newcastle United, in place of Jordan Pickford who had played 120 consecutive league games prior to that fixture. Everton lost the game 2–1.

Olsen played his second game for Everton on 16 December 2020, away from home in the league against Leicester City. Everton won the game 0–2 with Olsen keeping a clean sheet. Olsen also kept a clean sheet in his last game for Everton against Brighton & Hove Albion 12 April 2021. The goalkeeper impressed on the occasions he stepped into the side in place of Jordan Pickford. Despite Carlo Ancelotti's initial desire to bring the 31-year-old to Goodison Park on a permanent basis, the surprise exit of the Italian in the summer seemingly scuppered any hope of that taking place. While Everton instead brought both Asmir Begovic and Andy Lonergan to Merseyside to provide back-up to Pickford, Olsen opted to move to Sheffield United on loan.

Loan to Sheffield United
On 31 August 2021, Olsen joined Championship side Sheffield United. He made his debut on 14 September 2021, in a 2–2 draw against Preston North End. Olsen picked up an injury while on international duty in mid-November and did not play after that.

Loan to Aston Villa 
On 18 January 2022, Olsen was recalled from his Sheffield United loan, in order to join Aston Villa on loan for the remainder of the 2021–22 season.

The match was significant in the race between City and Liverpool, the three points leading to Manchester City winning the Premier League title. Amidst the post-match celebrations, Olsen was assaulted during a pitch invasion by Manchester City fans. Manchester City released a statement saying that "the club has launched an immediate investigation and once identified, the individual responsible will be issued with an indefinite stadium ban."

Aston Villa 
On 4 June 2022, Olsen signed for Aston Villa on a permanent basis, for an undisclosed fee rumoured to be in the region of £3m. On 29 October 2022, he made his first appearance since signing for Villa permanently in an away defeat to Newcastle United, coming off the bench to replace Emiliano Martínez, who had suffered a suspected concussion.

International career

Olsen was eligible for international play for both Denmark and Sweden. When he came to Malmö FF he said that he would prefer to play for Denmark but in 2014 he opted to play for Sweden according to Danish international coach Morten Olsen. On 15 January 2015, he made his debut for Sweden in a friendly fixture against the Ivory Coast.

In May 2016, Olsen was called up for Sweden's squad for UEFA Euro 2016, as back-up keeper for Andreas Isaksson. After Sweden's early exit from the tournament, Isaksson retired and Olsen became Sweden's first-choice goalkeeper.

In May 2018 he was named in Sweden's 23-man squad for the 2018 FIFA World Cup in Russia. At the 2018 World Cup, Olsen started in all five games for Sweden as they were eliminated by England in the quarter final.

Personal life
In March 2021, Olsen and his family were threatened with a machete by a masked gang during a raid on their home in Altrincham, Greater Manchester. The gang stole jewellery and a luxury watch during the burglary.

Career statistics

Club

International

Honours

Bunkeflo FF
 Division 5 Skåne Sydvästra A: 2010

IFK Klagshamn
 Division 2 Södra Götaland: 2011

Malmö FF
Allsvenskan: 2013, 2014
Svenska Supercupen: 2013

Copenhagen
Danish Superliga: 2015–16, 2016–17
Danish Cup: 2015–16, 2016–17

Individual
Allsvenskan goalkeeper of the year: 2014
Swedish Goalkeeper of the Year: 2016, 2017, 2018, 2019

References

External links

 Profile at the Aston Villa F.C. website

1990 births
Living people
Footballers from Malmö
Swedish people of Danish descent
Swedish footballers
Sweden international footballers
IF Limhamn Bunkeflo (men) players
Malmö FF players
PAOK FC players
F.C. Copenhagen players
A.S. Roma players
Cagliari Calcio players
Sheffield United F.C. players
Everton F.C. players
Aston Villa F.C. players
Allsvenskan players
Superettan players
Ettan Fotboll players
Division 2 (Swedish football) players
Super League Greece players
Danish Superliga players
Serie A players
Association football goalkeepers
Swedish expatriate footballers
Expatriate footballers in Greece
Expatriate men's footballers in Denmark
Expatriate footballers in Italy
Swedish expatriate sportspeople in Greece
Swedish expatriate sportspeople in Denmark
Swedish expatriate sportspeople in Italy
UEFA Euro 2016 players
2018 FIFA World Cup players
UEFA Euro 2020 players
BK Olympic players
Premier League players
Swedish victims of crime